Hydrotreated vegetable oil (HVO) is a biofuel made by the hydrocracking or hydrogenation of  vegetable oil. Hydrocracking breaks big molecules into smaller ones using hydrogen while hydrogenation adds hydrogen to molecules. These methods can be used to create substitutes for gasoline, diesel, propane, kerosene and other chemical feedstock. Diesel fuel produced from these sources is known as green diesel or renewable diesel.

Diesel fuel created by hydrotreating is called green diesel and is distinct from the biodiesel made through esterification.

Feedstock
The majority of plant and animal oils are vegetable oils which are triglycerides—suitable for refining. Refinery feedstock includes canola, algae, jatropha, salicornia, palm oil, and tallow. One type of algae, Botryococcus braunii produces a different type of oil, known as a triterpene, which is transformed into alkanes by a different process.

Comparison to biodiesel 
Both HVO diesel (green diesel) and biodiesel are made from the same vegetable oil feedstock. However the processing technologies and chemical makeup of the two fuels differ. The chemical reaction commonly used to produce biodiesel is known as transesterification.

The production of biodiesel also makes glycerol, but the production of HVO does not.

Commercialization
Various stages of converting renewable hydrocarbon fuels produced by hydrotreating is done throughout energy industry. Some commercial examples of vegetable oil refining are Neste NExBTL, Topsoe HydroFlex technology, Axens Vegan technology, H-Bio, the ConocoPhilips process, and the UOP/Eni Ecofining process. Neste is the largest manufacturer, producing 2 million tonnes annually (2013). Neste completed their first NExBTL plant in the summer 2007 and the second one in 2009. Petrobras planned to use  of vegetable oils in the production of H-Bio fuel in 2007. ConocoPhilips is processing  of vegetable oil. Other companies working on the commercialization and industrialization of renewable hydrocarbons and biofuels include Neste, REG Synthetic Fuels, LLC, ENI, UPM Biofuels, Diamond Green Diesel partnered with countries across the globe. In practice, these renewable diesels lower greenhouse gas emissions by 40-90%, have higher energy per content yields than petroleum-based diesels, and better cold-flow properties to work in colder climates. In addition, all of these green diesels can be introduced into any diesel engine or infrastructure without many mechanical modifications at any ratio with petroleum-based diesels.

Renewable diesel from vegetable oil is a growing substitute for petroleum. California fleets used over 200,000,000 gallons of renewable diesel in 2017. CARB predicts over 2 billion gallons of fuel to be consumed in the state under its Low Carbon Fuel Standard requirements in the next ten years. Fleets operating on Renewable Diesel from various refiners and feedstocks are reported to see lower emissions, reduced maintenance costs, and nearly identical experience when driving with this fuel.

See also 
 Algae fuel
 Renewable hydrocarbon fuels via decarboxylation/decarbonylation
 Sustainable oils
 Vegetable oil fuel

References

External links
 University Of Wisconsin / College Of Engineering (June 6, 2005). Green Diesel: New Process Makes Liquid Transportation Fuel From Plants. ScienceDaily. Retrieved August 10, 2010
 Renewable Diesel Primer. Retrieved August 10, 2010

Oil refining
Synthetic fuel technologies
Renewable energy technology
Biofuels
Renewable fuels